G.N. Gopal (born 29 March 1989) is an Indian Chess grandmaster from Cochin, Kerala.  Gopal became Kerala's first grandmaster in 2007 at the age of 18 and India's sixteenth grandmaster.

He won the bronze medal in the  prestigious 2010 Asian Games in Guangzhou, China in November 2010. 
He also won the bronze medal in the World Team Championship held in Bursa, Turkey in January 2010.

Early life
Gopal was born in a Nair family in Muvattupuzha as the second son of Prof B. Narayana Pillai and Prof  Geetha Prakasini. He has an elder brother Gokul who is a Computer Engineer.

Gopal started chess at the age of 10. He was initiated to chess by his father. He won his first National Championship in Chandigarh in 2001. He became the National Junior champion (U-20) at the age of 15 in 2004.
He won his first international championship in his first international exposure in 2003 in  Dubai Juniors, Dubai.

Personal life

Gopal is working as Assistant Manager in Bharat Petroleum. He lives in Aluva.

Key achievements

Created history at the age of 18 by becoming Kerala's first  & sixteenth Grand Master of the country.

National events

Gold in  National Junior (U-20) 2004 in Tirupathi (2004)
Silver in National Premier (Men's) Championship in Delhi (Dec 2010)
Tied for second spot in the National Premier (Men's) Championship in Chennai (2008)
Gold in National U-12 Rapid in Chandigarh (2001)
Silver in National Junior in Delhi (August 2006)

Asian events

Bronze medal in the  Asian Games 2010 held in Guangzhou, China (Nov 2010)
Silver in Asian Team Championship in China (May 2012)
Silver in Asian Zonals Dhaka 2007
Silver  in Asian Team Championship, Vizag, 2008 and Gold medal on board-4 for individual performance
Bronze for board performance in Asian Team Blitz Championship (May 2012)
Bronze in Asian Sub-Junior Championship, Teheran, 2004
Qualified to the FIDE World Cup from the Asian Continental Championship in Philippines, 2007

Olympiads and World Team 2010

Olympiads: He has represented India in three successive Chess Olympiads namely Dresden 2008,Khanty-Mansiysk 2010 and Istanbul 2012

World Team Chess Championship 2010: His team India won bronze in the prestigious World Team 2010

Recognition

He received the prestigious Tigran Mets Medal during the Lake Sevan 2007 where he was the joint winner. "The Tigran Mets Medal" is a highly prestigious and very special honor of the Republic of Armenia.

References

External links

 

1989 births
Living people
Chess grandmasters
Indian chess players
Sportspeople from Kochi
Asian Games medalists in chess
Chess players at the 2010 Asian Games
Asian Games bronze medalists for India
Medalists at the 2010 Asian Games
People from Muvattupuzha